Petryk is a surname. People with this surname include:

 Anastasiya Petryk (Nastya Petryk) (born 2004), Ukrainian singer
 Dan Petryk (born 1965), Canadian curler
 Hernán Petryk (born 1994), Uruguayan professional footballer
 Steve Petryk (born 1963), Canadian curler, older brother of Dan Petryk
 Viktoria Petryk (Vika Petryk) (born 1997), Ukrainian singer
 Warren Petryk (born 1955), American politician